The fourth season of StarStruck, aka (StarStruck: The Next Level) is a Philippine television reality talent competition show, was broadcast on GMA Network. Hosted by Dingdong Dantes, Jolina Magdangal and Raymond Gutierrez, it premiered on December 4, 2006. The council was composed of Louie Ignacio, Lorna Tolentino and Douglas Quijano. The season ended with 91 episodes on March 25, 2007, having Jewel Mische, Aljur Abrenica, Kris Bernal and Mart Escudero as the Ultimate Survivors.

The series is streaming online on YouTube.

Overview
The fourth season of StarStruck was formally announced the return of their reality-based talent show on September 3, 2006.  GMA Network's variety program, SOP, where the hosts invited the age limit is set from 15 to 21 years old to audition for the upcoming season. Much of the auditions were held at the GMA Network's headquarters and at SM Supermalls throughout the Philippines.

The pilot episode was aired on December 4, 2006. The new improve edition of the popular show. The StarStruck is shown only weekdays having Fridays as elimination night, this season Mondays to Fridays will be tests and Sundays would be the elimination night. The show held its the Final Judgment on March 25, 2007 at the Marikina Sports Center in Marikina.

Selection process
In the fourth year of the reality-talent search, Out of numerous who auditioned nationwide, only Top 100 was chosen for the first cut. From Top 100, it was trimmed down to Top 80, then from Top 80 to Top 40, These Top 40 dreamers (twenty males and twenty females) will undergo their first artista test, until only final twenty finalists will be left. Unlike the previous batches which launched the final fourteen finalists, these batches were trimmed down to twenty, dubbed as the final twenty finalists. The final twenty underwent various workshops and trainings in order to develop their personalities, talents, and charisma.

The Final 20 were reduced to the Circle 16, until they formed the Final 14 finalists. But, the twist is that every week, two hopefuls from the final fourteen may have to say goodbye and this time only six remain. Those who were eliminated were dubbed as StarStruck Avengers.

This time instead of the Final 4, this season made it the Final 6 will vie for the coveted for the new ultimate titles, the Ultimate Loveteam, the Ultimate Hunk and the Ultimate Sweetheart, both of them will received P1,000,000 pesos each plus and an exclusive management contract from GMA Network. Belgian Waffle franchises worth P250,000 pesos each and P50,00 pesos gift certificates to Manny Calayan, and scholarships to Informatics.

The First Prince and First Princess, both of them will received P250,000 pesos each plus and an exclusive management contract from the network. The StarStruck Avengers (the losing contestants) also received an exclusive contract from the network.

It also featured new ultimate titles in StarStruck History, the Ultimate Loveteam, the Ultimate Hunk and the Ultimate Sweetheart.

Hopefuls
Then the number was narrowed down to Top 80 dreamers, Last Sunday night December 10, 2006. The TOP 80 hopefuls became TOP 40, TOP 20 females and TOP 20 males. These Top 40 hopefuls are now closer in their quest to become the final twenty finalists. In this season, hopefuls has a One on One session interview in the council was formed with Louie Ignacio, Lorna Tolentino and Douglas Quijano.

These Top 40 dreamers will undergo their first artista test this week and ten hopefuls of them will be eliminated next Sunday, December 17, 2006. After which, second artista test and ten hopefuls more will be eliminated next Sunday, December 24, 2006 the following week, until only final twenty finalists will be left. As an exciting twist to the show, for this season, instead of having just the traditional final fourteen finalists, there will be the final twenty finalists who will compete in various challenges. The hopefuls who will standout and survive these challenges will be part of the final fourteen finalists.

When the Final 20 was chosen, they are assigned to different challenges every week that will hone their acting, singing, and dancing abilities. Every Sunday, two is meant to leave the competition until there were just eight others who are left. From danger eight, there will be two of them who will be eliminated and after the elimination the two; the final six will be revealed.

The Final 6 will be battling with each other on the Final Judgment. People will choose who they want to win the competition by online voting and text voting. 50% of the result will come from the online and text votes and the remaining 50% is from the council.

Avengers Strike's Back Twists
This season, the twist is that the avengers (losing contestants) of the fourth season will be the competitors of the survivors in the one week challenges.

The avengers competing with the remaining survivors are Lui Perez, Chariz Solomon, Jean de Castro, Chad Burden, Lizzy Pecson, Renee Lascuña, Hazel Uy, Dex Quindoza, Jan Manual and Rich Asuncion. Except, Kiko Junio and Dave Valentino did not attend on the first day of the avengers challenge, two were eliminated since there were ten avengers and only eight survivors. Those that were eliminated were Jean de Castro and Renee Lascuña.

At the end of the Survivors Versus Avengers week, four out of the eight avengers were eliminated and the other four were chosen to compete in the Danger 8 challenge week.  The four that were eliminated: Lui Perez, Chariz Solomon, Chad Burden and Hazel Uy. The four that were chosen for the next weeks challenge were Lizzy Pecson, Dex Quindoza, Jan Manual and Rich Asuncion.

Danger Eight Twists
The end of the Survivors Versus Avengers week, four avengers out of the eight were chosen to continue competing in the show to have the right to join the remaining survivors. From the eight survivors, Mart Escudero and Jesi Corcuera were eliminated and were asked to join the avengers group to compete for the two Survivor Spots available that will complete the danger eight.

The avengers group consists of Lizzy Pecson, Dex Quindoza, Jan Manual, Rich Asuncion, Mart Escudero and Jesi Corcuera. Voting for the remaining survivors was temporarily closed and was opened for the six competing avengers. At the end of the week, Rich Asuncion and Mart Escudero were chosen for the two remaining survivor spots and thus completed the danger eight.

The Danger 8 are now consists of Jewel Mische, Kris Bernal, Rich Asuncion, Stef Prescott, Aljur Abrenica, Mart Escudero, Paulo Avelino and Prince Stefan.

Color key:

Weekly Artista Tests
Color key:

Week 1: The Top 40 hopefuls, were reduced to the Top 30 hopefuls.

Challenge Winner Contestant: Not Awarded

Week 2: The Top 30 hopefuls, the official Final 20 hopefuls have been chosen.

Challenge Winner Contestant: Not Awarded

Week 3: The Final 20 hopefuls, were reduced to the Circle 16 hopefuls.

Challenge Winner Contestant: Not Awarded

Week 4: The Circle 16 hopefuls, the official Final 14 hopefuls have been chosen.

Challenge Winner Contestant: Not Awarded

Week 5: The Final 14 hopefuls.

Challenge Winner Contestant: Not Awarded

Week 6: The Final 12 hopefuls.

Week 7: The Final 10 hopefuls.

Challenge Winner Contestant: Not Awarded
Eliminated Contestant: None

Week 8: The Final 10 hopefuls.

Challenge Winner Contestant: Not Awarded

Week 9: The Final 8 hopefuls. First week of The Avengers Strike's Back Twsits.

Challenge Winner Contestant: Not Awarded
Bottom Group Contestant: None
Eliminated Contestant: None

Avengers Strike's Back Twists

Week 10: The Final 8 hopefuls. Second week of The Avengers Strike's Back Twsits.

Challenge Winner Contestant: Not Awarded

Avengers Strike's Back Twists

Week 11: The Danger 8 hopefuls. Third week of The Avengers Strike's Back Twists.

Bottom Group Contestant: None
Eliminated Contestant: None

Avengers Strike's Back Twists

Danger 8 Twists

Week 12-13: The Danger 8 hopefuls.

Challenge Winner Contestant: Not Awarded

Week 14: The Survivor 6 Homecoming

Week 15: The Final Judgment, the Ultimate Survivors have been proclaimed.

Final Judgment
The winner was announced on a two-hour TV special dubbed as StarStruck The Next Level: The Final Judgment was held live on March 25, 2007 at the Marikina Sports Center once again. StarStruck fans filled the Marikina Sports Center to capacity to witness the show's final judgment, which was hosted by Dingdong Dantes, Jolina Magdangal, and Raymond Gutierrez. A filled Marikina Sports Center was witness to the much-awaited event.

The final six the opening number performance song and dance by Destiny Child’s Say My Name. Aside from being the final judgment, it was a celebration of the highly successful artista search and involved special performances from the graduates, both survivors and avengers a dance number performance song of DJ Webstar’s Chicken Noodle Soup.

The council are composed of Louie Ignacio, Lorna Tolentino and Douglas Quijano was joined by GMA-7's senior vice-president for entertainment-TV Wilma Galvante and GMA Films president Anette Gozon-Abrogar (both not pictured) for the final judgment night.

The avengers’ performance came in next, in a song and dance medley detailing the journey of the survivors from the audition process, until the introduction of the final twenty, the eight International contenders and the elimination of the fourteen avengers for a dance number.

The final six then performed their own dance numbers the male survivors, Aljur Abrenica sang and dance by a song of Blue’s Best In Me, Mart Escudero a dance number by a song of Aligator Project’s Stomp, Hip-Hop Dance Remix performing a solo dance number with the Manoeuvres and Prince Stefan a dance number by a song of ?’s ?, Perform  a solo dance number with the Manoeuvres and next the female survivors, Jewel Mische a dance number by a song of Tata Young’s El Nin-Yo, Perform  a solo dance number with the Manoeuvres, Kris Bernal a dance number by a song of  ?’s ?, Perform  a solo dance number with the Manoeuvres and Rich Asuncion a dance number by a song of Jennifer Hudson’s featuring Beyonce One Night Only, Perform  a solo dance number with the Manoeuvres.

Other awards honoured that night were Jan Manual for Dats Entertaining Award, Dex Quindoza for male with The Most Dramatic Exit, Stef Prescott for female with The Most Dramatic Exit, and Jesi Corcuera for The Best Taktak Award.

Before the top winners were announced, Regine Velasquez performed by the songs of Michael Bolton’s Go The Distance, Mariah Carey’s Can’t Take That Away, Carrie Underwood’s Jesus, Take The Wheel,  Mariah Carey’s Never Too Far and Through The Rain, Patti La Belle’s There’s A Winner In You, and Jekyll & Hyde’s This Is The Moment, for the remaining six contenders, while pre-taped played on a big screen of them thanking their supporters.

Announcement come, Mart Escudero of General Mariano Alvarez, Cavite got 267,703 votes, and Kris Bernal of Quezon City got 177,600 votes, they are the Ultimate Loveteam,  Aljur Abrenica of Angeles, Pampanga got 280,084 votes, is the Ultimate Hunk and Jewel Mische of Bocaue, Bulacan got 157,618 votes, is the Ultimate Sweetheart were proclaimed as the Ultimate Survivors,  all four winners both received P1,000,000 pesos each plus and an exclusive management contract from GMA Network worth P2,000,000 pesos each, Belgian Waffle franchises worth P250,000 pesos each, P50,00 gift certificates to Manny Calayan, and Scholarships to Informatics.

The winners will be included in the youth-oriented show Boys Nxt Door except Jewel Mische. The Ultimate Hunk and Ultimate Sweetheart will be part of a separate GMA teledrama and The Ultimate Loveteam will be introduced in a Regal Films movie with Judy Ann Santos and Dennis Trillo which is Mag-ingat Ka sa Kulam.

While, Prince Stefan of Iloilo City got 193,503 votes, is the First Prince and Rich Asuncion of Tagbilaran, Bohol got 151,981 votes, is the First Princess were proclaimed the Runners-up, each of them received P250,000 pesos each plus and an exclusive management contract from the network. The StarStruck Avengers (the losing contestants) also received an exclusive contract from the network.

Thus, Kris Bernal and Aljur Abrenica received the Texter's Choice awards giving them both commercial endorsements for BNY. Jewel Mische will also receive a modelling contract with the Dutch Mill Yogurt Drink because she wins the title Ultimate Sweetheart. The Final Judgment gained 24.1% rating; relatively high as the finale finished very late, reaching until 1:15 the following morning, but the ratings that they gained that very night was more than enough to beat their rival show that very night.

TV Assignment
For their first TV Assignment, the survivor six Aljur Abrenica, Kris Bernal, Mart Escudero and Rich Asuncion except Jewel Mische and Prince Stefan with the avengers Paulo Avelino, Stef Prescott, Jesi Corcuera, Jan Manual and Kiko Junio for upcoming cast of the youth-oriented show Boys Nxt Door. 
They co-starred with the StarStruck alumna Marky Cielo, Mark Herras, Sheena Halili and Ailyn Luna.

Signature dances
There are signature dances and songs made in each batch. With this batch, their signature dances and songs are:
Fergalicious
Mosquito
Itaktak Mo                                                                                                                                                                                                                                                                                                                                                                                              
El Nin-YO

Elimination chart
Color key:

Notes

 These Top 40 dreamers will undergo their first artista test this week and ten hopefuls of them will be eliminated next Sunday, December 17, 2006. After which, second artista test and ten hopefuls more will be eliminated next Sunday, December 24, 2006 the following week, until only final twenty survivors will be left.
 The four survivors were eliminated from the first week. They are Kiko Junio, Lui Perez, Chariz Solomon and Jean de Castro. The two survivors were eliminated from the second week to complete the final fourteen. They are Chad Burden and Lizzy Pecson.
 It was a non-elimination week. The bottom group are Jan Manual, Jesi Corcuera, Mart Escudero, Stef Prescott and Prince Stefan was safe for the elimination on January 28, 2007.
 The week ending February 11, 2007, includes The avengers strike back twist while the week ending February 25, 2007, includes The danger eight twist. In the avengers strike back twist, all avengers from the Top 20 and Top 14 returned Chariz Solomon, Chad Burden, Jean de Castro, Lui Perez, Lizzy Pecson, Renee Lascuña, Hazel Uy, Dex Quindoza, Jan Manual, Rich Asuncion and followed by Jesi Corcuera and Mart Escudero. Except, for Kiko Junio and Dave Valentino where four will be chosen for the danger eight twist. Out of all the avengers who didn't make it in the final fourteen, Lizzy Pecson is the only one who advanced in the danger eight twist. However, she failed to advance in this round.
 At the end of the week, Mart Escudero and Rich Asuncion were chosen for the two remaining survivor spots and thus completed the danger eight.
 It was a non-elimination week. The bottom group are the remaining danger eight, was safe for the elimination on March 3, 2007.
 The final six was chosen on March 11, 2007. And the last avengers are Paulo Avelino and Stef Prescott. The first called to eliminated is Paulo Avelino and the second called is Stef Prescott.
 In the final judgment night, Jewel Mische, Aljur Abrenica, Kris Bernal and Mart Escudero were proclaimed as the Ultimate Survivors.

References

External links
 

StarStruck (Philippine TV series)
2006 Philippine television seasons
2007 Philippine television seasons